The 1982 Detroit Lions season was the 53rd season in franchise history. An NFL players strike shortened the regular season to nine games. 

The NFL changed the playoff format due to the strike to allow the top eight teams in each conference to qualify. Because of this, the Lions qualified for their first postseason appearance since 1970, becoming one of only four teams to ever qualify for the playoffs despite having a losing record. The Lions and the 1982 Cleveland Browns are the only two teams with a losing record to qualify as wildcards. 

The Lions lost to the Washington Redskins at RFK Stadium in the first round of the playoffs.

It would not be until 2010 when the Seattle Seahawks became the third team with a losing record to qualify for the playoffs (7–9), the first to do so in a 16-game season and the first to win a division title with a losing record.
The Carolina Panthers in 2014 (7–8–1) and Washington in 2020 (7–9) have subsequently won their divisions and made the postseason with losing records.

Offseason

NFL draft

Roster

Regular season

Schedule

Standings

Season summary

Week 12

Playoffs

The Redskins jumped to a 24–0 lead en route to a 31–7 victory over the Lions.

Records
Regular Season record
 First team with a losing record (4–5, .444) to qualify for the playoffs. Shared with Cleveland Browns
 Worst regular season record (4–5, .444) to qualify for the playoffs. Shared with Cleveland Browns. Broken by the 2010 Seattle Seahawks and later matched by the 2020 Washington Football Team (7–9, .438).

References

Detroit Lions on Pro Football Reference
Detroit Lions on jt-sw.com
Detroit Lions on The Football Database

Detroit Lions
Detroit Lions seasons
Detroit Lions